Qahzah is a sub-district located in Hubaysh District, Ibb Governorate, Yemen. Qahzah had a population of 5429 according to the 2004 census.

References 

Sub-districts in Hubaysh District